Ghanasyampur is a village within the jurisdiction of the Falta police station in the Falta CD block in the Diamond Harbour subdivision of the South 24 Parganas district in the Indian state of West Bengal.

Geography

Demographics
As per 2011 Census of India, Ghanasyampur had a total population of 2,651.

Transport
A short stretch of local roads link Ghanasyampur to the National Highway 12.

Healthcare
Falta Block Primary Health Centre, with 10 beds, at Falta, is the major government medical facility in the Falta CD block.

References

Villages in South 24 Parganas district